Mores is a comune (municipality) in the Province of Sassari in the Italian region Sardinia, located about  north of Cagliari and about  southeast of Sassari.

Located at the bottom of Mount Lachesos, Mores is home to two thousand residents.

Mores borders the following municipalities: Ardara, Bonnanaro, Bonorva, Ittireddu, Ozieri, Siligo, Torralba.

Twin towns
Mores is twinned with:

  Santa Giuletta, Italy

References

Cities and towns in Sardinia